Fastnacht Day (also spelled Fasnacht, or in Pennsylvania German: Faasenacht) is an annual Pennsylvania Dutch celebration that falls on Shrove Tuesday, the day before Ash Wednesday. The word translates to "Fasting Night" or “Almost Night” in English. The tradition is to eat the very best foods, which are part of the German tradition, and much of them, before the Lenten fast. Fastnachts (pronounced /ˈfastnaxt/ in German) are similar to doughnuts. There are three types of Fasnacht, one made with yeast, one made with baking powder, and one made with potatoes and yeast. All are slightly crispy on the outside and not as sweet as doughnuts.

History

Traditionally, fastnachts are made to use up the lard, sugar, butter, eggs and other rich foods in a house before the austere diet of Lent begins. In Catholic and Protestant countries, Fastnacht Day is also called "Fat Tuesday," or "Mardi Gras," a name which predates the Reformation and referred to the Christian tradition of eating rich foods before the Lenten fast began. In some South American countries, the day is associated with Carnival, a festival of dancing, drinking and debauchery. "Carnival," which is the English spelling, derives from the words "carne levar," or "meat takeaway," another Lenten tradition.
Fastnacht can also be spelled in various ways, such as "fasnacht", "fassenacht," or "faschnacht." The word "fastnacht" means "the night before the fast," since they are eaten the night before Lent, when fasting is usually observed by many Christians until Easter Sunday. Making and eating fastnachts was a way to consume all the fats, such as butter and lard, kept in the house pantry, as these rich ingredients were seen as lavish and were not supposed to be eaten during the Lenten season.

Traditional celebrations
One popular recipe is the one that calls for mixing the dough with mashed potatoes, which gives the yeast raised fastnachts a flavor all its own, not be confused with commercial donuts. Since Pennsylvania Dutch farm families were quite large, when the "Haus Frau" (housewife) began to fry the raised fastnachts in her warm kitchen the tantalizing smell of these raised donut-like cakes lingered throughout the farmhouse. Naturally, the wiser members of the family were awoken, and realized that if they got up early they could share in Mother's fastnacht treats. But the less wise ones or lazy ones may have continued in their slumber, while the siblings enjoyed fresh fastnachts with a beverage. The last person up on Shrove Tuesday was called the "Fastnacht" and kidded all day long for being late for this wonderful breakfast.  In the same way, the last person up on Ash Wednesday was also teased, and called the "Ashepuddle", whose chore for the day was to carry the ashes in the stoves and ovens outside to the ash pile.  Fastnachts were a winter staple of the Dutch housewife and could be eaten long past Ash Wednesday, even though originally fried in pork lard, the day before Lent. Shrove Tuesday fastnacht baking was a way of life in which the Pennsylvania Dutch people celebrated its ethnicity, more than going to church; it was a folk-life practice that was more personal. These yeast raised cakes had been rolled out and then cut into squares, triangles, or rectangles to rise near an old cast iron kitchen stove. Older Church congregations in the East Penn Valley still have Fastnacht Church Socials or suppers in which natives gather for fellowship, enjoying their Pennsylvania Dutch heritage.
In today's time several large corporations are producing fastnachts in a unique way: the substitution of Coca Cola for the milk or coffee of the original recipe. This gives them a special/unique flavor. This was later to become the Coca-Cola recipe of the fastnacht. 
Traditionally the fastnacht didn't have a hole in it, it was cut, or slit, through the middle to allow air and the placement of condiments such as jelly, and butter. Some cultures add molasses (king syrup) or "Turkey Brand" syrup to enhance the flavor.

Date

Fastnacht dates:

See also
 Swabian-Alemannic Fastnacht
 Nuremberg Shrovetide Carnival

References

Observances in the United States
Mardi Gras
February observances
March observances
Holidays based on the date of Easter